The S7 service of the S-Bahn Rhein-Main system bearing the KBS (German scheduled railway route) number 645.7

Routes

Mannheim–Frankfurt railway

History 
The S7 is the newest S-Bahn service in the system. It started its operation in 2002. Before that a regional railway service (RB 70) ran on exactly the same route.

Operation

External links 

 traffiQ Frankfurt – S7 timetable

Rhine-Main S-Bahn